FC Ahrobiznes Volochysk is an association football club from Volochysk, Khmelnytskyi Oblast, competing in the Ukrainian First League.

History
The club was founded in December 2015 in place of recently dissolved FC Zbruch.

In summer of 2014, former president of Zbruch Volochysk Yevhen Sinkov gave interview to UA-Football and told story about Zbruch and the Volochysk football. A football team in Volochysk existed since 1960s, but its active development started already in 1970s. In 1974 there was a team under name of Mashynobudivnyk Volochysk which sometime in 1976 won the Khmelnytskyi Oblast championship. Sometime in 1980s it was dissolved. In 1989, the city's team was revived as Strila Volochysk and also won another regional title (Khmelnytskyi Oblast Football Championship).

In 1990, the club was known as Zbruch Volochysk and in 1991 again won the regional championship. In 1994–2006 the team was financed by the city municipality (city council) which was presided by Ivan Rybachuk. After that for the next couple of years the team was sponsored by local company Ahrobiznes. In 2008 the president of Zbruch was elected the president of Volochysk Raion Football Federation Yevhen Sinkov. In 2008–2014 Ihor Shyshkin was a head coach of Zbruch Volochysk. 

Sinkov also mentioned that Volochysk has couple of sports schools with football sections "Osvita" and "Kolos" which field several youth teams for various age categories in competitions of the Youth Football League of Ukraine (DUFLU). Those junior teams are coached by graduates of the Lviv School of Physical Culture (Lviv UFK). In 2014 Sinkov was mentioning that president of Ahrobiznes Oleh Sobutsky was one of several sponsors of Zbruch.

The new club Ahrobiznes does not lay any claims of being related to its predecessor. Sponsored by a company from neighboring settelement of Pidvolochysk, Ternopil Oblast, it was officially created as soon as Zbruch was dissolved. The head coach of FC Ahrobiznes became a native of Volochysk and former professional footballer Andriy Donets, his assistant as senior coach became former head coach of Zbruch Ihor Shyshkin, the club's sports director became former president of Zbruch Yevhen Sinkov, the chief of squad became a director of local sports school Vitaliy Kerepko, executive director Vasyl Zabolotniy.

In 2016, the club entered the national amateur competitions of AAFU which was transitioning them from calendar year (spring-fall) to split calendar year (fall-spring). It was a half year competition and Ahrobiznes after winning a multi-group stage by placing first and qualifying for play-offs was able to reach the final but lost it in extra time to defending title champions FC Balkany Zorya from Odessa Oblast. The next season which was substantially restructured the Ahrobiznes first team once again placed first in group and qualified to play-offs. Among notable opponents during this period was the future Ukrainian Premier League member FC Lviv. In play-offs, Ahrobiznes reached finals and with a score 4:0 defeated FC Metalist 1925 Kharkiv which was created soon after bankruptcy of FC Metalist Kharkiv.

Honours

Ahrobiznes (since 2016)
 Ukrainian Second League
 Champions (1): 2017–18
 Ukrainian football championship among amateurs
 Winners (1): 2016–17
 Runners-up (1): 2016

 Football championship of Khmelnytskyi Oblast
 Winners (1): 2016

Zbruch (1989–2015)
 Football championship of Khmelnytskyi Oblast
 Winners (9): 1991, 2000, 2005, 2008, 2009, 2011, 2012, 2014, 2015
 Runners-up (3): 2001, 2010, 2013

 Khmelnytskyi Oblast Football Cup
 Winners (5): 2010, 2011, 2012, 2014, 2015

Players

Current squad
As of 26 August 2022

Out on loan

Seasons

{|class="wikitable"
|-bgcolor="#efefef"
! Season
! Div.
! Pos.
! Pl.
! W
! D
! L
! GS
! GA
! P
!Ukrainian Cup
!colspan=2|Other
!Notes
|-
|align=center colspan=14|FC Zbruch Volochysk
|-bgcolor=SteelBlue
|align=center rowspan=2|2009
|align=center rowspan=2|4th
|align=center bgcolor=gold|1
|align=center|8
|align=center|7
|align=center|1
|align=center|0
|align=center|16
|align=center|4
|align=center|22
|align=center rowspan=2|
|align=center rowspan=2|
|align=center rowspan=2|
|align=center|
|-bgcolor=SteelBlue
|align=center bgcolor=tan|3
|align=center|3
|align=center|1
|align=center|0
|align=center|2
|align=center|2
|align=center|6
|align=center|3
|align=center|
|-bgcolor=SteelBlue
|align=center|2010
|align=center colspan=10|club in regional competitions
|align=center|AC
|align=center|
|align=center|
|-bgcolor=SteelBlue
|align=center rowspan=2|2011
|align=center rowspan=2|4th
|align=center bgcolor=silver|2
|align=center|12
|align=center|8
|align=center|1
|align=center|3
|align=center|20
|align=center|12
|align=center|25
|align=center rowspan=2|
|align=center rowspan=2|AC
|align=center rowspan=2|
|align=center|
|-bgcolor=SteelBlue
|align=center|4
|align=center|3
|align=center|0
|align=center|0
|align=center|3
|align=center|3
|align=center|8
|align=center|0
|align=center|
|-bgcolor=SteelBlue
|align=center|2012
|align=center colspan=10|club in regional competitions
|align=center|AC
|align=center|
|align=center|
|-bgcolor=SteelBlue
|align=center|2013
|align=center|4th
|align=center bgcolor=tan|3
|align=center|10
|align=center|4
|align=center|3
|align=center|3
|align=center|11
|align=center|13
|align=center|15
|align=center|
|align=center|
|align=center|
|align=center|
|-bgcolor=SteelBlue
|align=center|2014
|align=center colspan=10|club in regional competitions
|align=center|AC
|align=center|
|align=center|
|-bgcolor=SteelBlue
|align=center|2015
|align=center colspan=10|club in regional competitions
|align=center|AC
|align=center|
|align=center|
|-
|align=center colspan=14|club reorganized as FC Ahrobiznes Volochysk
|-bgcolor=SteelBlue
|align=center|2016
|align=center|4th
|align=center bgcolor=gold|1
|align=center|6
|align=center|3
|align=center|2
|align=center|1
|align=center|10
|align=center|3
|align=center|11
|align=center|
|align=center|AL
|align=center bgcolor=silver|
|align=center|
|-bgcolor=SteelBlue
|align=center|2016–17
|align=center|4th
|align=center bgcolor=gold|1
|align=center|20
|align=center|14
|align=center|6
|align=center|0
|align=center|36
|align=center|5
|align=center|48
|align=center|
|align=center|AL
|align=center bgcolor=gold|
|align=center|
|-bgcolor=PowderBlue
|align=center|2017–18
|align=center|3rd
|align=center bgcolor=gold|1
|align=center|27 
|align=center|23 
|align=center| 1  
|align=center|3  
|align=center|70
|align=center|19  
|align=center|70
|align=center| finals
|align=center|
|align=center|
|align=center bgcolor=lightgreen|Promoted
|-bgcolor=LightCyan
|align=center|2018–19
|align=center|2nd
|align=center bgcolor=pink|13
|align=center|28
|align=center|3
|align=center|10
|align=center|15
|align=center|17
|align=center|36
|align=center|19
|align=center| finals
|align=center|
|align=center|
|align=center|Relegation play-off
|-bgcolor=LightCyan
|align=center|2019–20
|align=center|2nd
|align=center|4
|align=center|30
|align=center|19
|align=center|3
|align=center|8
|align=center|52
|align=center|30
|align=center|60
|align=center| finals
|align=center|
|align=center|
|align=center|
|-bgcolor=LightCyan
|align=center|2020–21
|align=center|2nd
|align=center|5
|align=center|30 	
|align=center|15 	
|align=center|7 	
|align=center|8 	
|align=center|46 	
|align=center|27 	 
|align=center|52
|align=center bgcolor=tan| finals
|align=center|
|align=center|
|align=center|
|}

Coaches
 2016–2019 Andriy Donets
 2019 Ostap Markevych
 2019 Oleksandr Ivanov (interim)
 2019– Oleksandr Chyzhevskyi

References

External links
 Official website
 FC Ahrobiznes Volochysk at footlive.com

 
Ukrainian First League clubs
Football clubs in Khmelnytskyi Oblast
Association football clubs established in 2015
2015 establishments in Ukraine